The 2017–18 Oregon State Beavers men's basketball team represented Oregon State University in the 2017–18 NCAA Division I men's basketball season. The Beavers were led by fourth-year head coach Wayne Tinkle, and played their home games at Gill Coliseum in Corvallis, Oregon as members of the Pac-12 Conference. They finished the season 16–16, 7–11 in Pac-12 play to finish in tenth place. They defeated Washington in the first round of the Pac-12 tournament before losing in the quarterfinals to USC.

Previous season
The 2016–17 Beavers finished the 2016–17 season 5–27, 1–17 in the Pac-12 to finish last. They lost to California in the first round of the Pac-12 Tournament.

Off-season

Departures

Incoming transfers

2017 recruiting class

Roster

 Sophomore guard JaQuori McLaughlin elected to transfer after seven games into the season.

Depth chart

Schedule and results

|-
!colspan=12 style="background:#; color:#;"| Exhibition

|-
!colspan=12 style="background:#; color:#;"| Non-conference regular season

|-
!colspan=12 style="background:#;"| Pac-12 regular season

|-
!colspan=12 style="background:#;"| Pac-12 tournament

References

Oregon State Beavers men's basketball seasons
Oregon State
Oregon State Beavers men's basketball
Oregon State Beavers men's basketball